Windmill Broadcasting is an online local community radio station, broadcasting to Stafford, Staffordshire from the Broad Eye Windmill. It is the only known radio station in the world to broadcast from a windmill.

Windmill Broadcasting can be heard online, on TuneIn, and on Wi-Fi radios, and is operated entirely by volunteers, with no paid members of staff.

History 
Windmill Broadcasting took over broadcasting at Broad Eye Windmill from a previous radio station in April 2016.

Since launching in 2016, Windmill Broadcasting has been self-funded through events and membership subscriptions, which means no adverts are aired during the station's output. The station's primary interest is in the renovation of the Broad Eye Windmill.

Present day 
Presently, Windmill Broadcasting broadcasts online for 24 hours per day, with specialist shows, local community interest shows and music, with most of the regular programming going out in the evening and at weekends.

Windmill Broadcasting has appeared at many events in the community including the annual Party in the Park in Stafford, the Acoustic Festival of Britain in Uttoxeter, community fun days and the Cub Scout 100th Birthday celebrations.

Aims 

Windmill Broadcasting has a number of aims. As well as being based in the Broad Eye Windmill, the heritage location reflects the station's ethos of working with projects within the Stafford community and assisting them in achieving their goals.

One of the aims of Windmill Broadcasting is to work with the Broad Eye Windmill (Stafford) members to assist with fundraising and renovation, and to boost awareness of the windmill. All of the volunteers are members of Broad Eye Windmill (Stafford), who work voluntarily in conjunction with the Mill's committee. Indeed, a number of Windmill Broadcasting directors also serve as Broad Eye Windmill directors.

Another aim is to provide a platform for local talent and bands to promote themselves, and is also a feature for local people to talk about their trade, crafts and charities.

Current presenters and shows 
The current schedule and presenters are listed on the Windmill Broadcasting web site.

References

External links 
Windmill Broadcasting website
Windmill Broadcasting on Facebook
Windmill Broadcasting on Twitter
Broad Eye Windmill Facebook page
Broad Eye Windmill Twitter page

Community radio stations in the United Kingdom
Radio stations in Staffordshire
Internet radio stations in the United Kingdom
Stafford
Radio stations established in 2016